Euphemia Johnson Richmond ( Guernsey; pen names, Effie Johnson and Mrs. E. J. Richmond; July 28, 1825 – February 9, 1918) was an American litterateur and author of novels and children's literature. Her early sketches, published in periodicals, were under the pen name, "Effie Johnson", but her later work was under her own name styled as "Mrs. E. J. Richmond".

Early life and education
Euphemia Johnson Guernsey was born near Mount Upton, New York, July 28, 1825. Her father, Dr. Jonathan Guernsey (1890-1853), was a native of New Hampshire. Her mother was Frances (1799-1877), a daughter of Dr. Elijah Putnam, a relative of the Revolutionary hero. On both sides, her ancestors were professional and literary people. Richmond's siblings were: Caroline (b. 1821), Phebe (b. 1823), Theodore (b. 1827), Addison (1829), George (b. 1830), Henry (b. 1833), Augustus (b. 1835), Francis (b. 1839).

She received good schooling and became an omnivorous reader.

Career
Richmond's literary talents were shown at an early age. In spite of all the responsibilities of her home life, she found time to jot down her thoughts in rhyme or prose. Her first poem and prose sketch was published in The Ladies' Repository (Cincinnati). She contributed poems to the New-York Tribune . Her story, "The Harwoods", appeared next, and her pen name, "Effie Johnson", began to attract attention. She wrote many sketches under that name.

Since childhood, Richmond was interested in temperance work, and one of her early stories, The McAllisters, was a temperance history based on the lives of persons known to her. The National Temperance Publication Society published that book, with her full name attached, paying for the manuscript. The book was very successful.

She published in rapid succession a dozen or more books, among which were Anna Maynard, The King's Daughter, Roy's Wife, How Sandy Came to His Fortune, Dividing of the Ways, The Jewelled Serpent, Harry the Prodigal, The Fatal Dower, Alice Grant, Rose Clifton, Woman, First and Last, and What She has Done (in two volumes), Drifting and Anchored, The Two Paths, Hope Raymond, Aunt Chloe, and Illustrated Scripture Primer. Her many volumes were widely read, especially in the southern States.

Personal life
On August 5, 1846, in Guilford, New York, she married Orson Richmond (1824-1904). They had three children: Catharina (b. 1848), Mary (b. 1850), and Nelson (b. 1857).

Richmond was a member of the Methodist church. She made her home in Mount Upton, New York, where she died February 9, 1918.

Selected works

References

External links
 
 

1825 births
1918 deaths
People from Guilford, New York
Writers from New York (state)
19th-century American writers
20th-century American writers
19th-century American novelists
20th-century American novelists
19th-century American women writers
20th-century American women writers
Wikipedia articles incorporating text from A Woman of the Century
American religious writers
19th-century pseudonymous writers
Pseudonymous women writers
American children's writers